Philip Graves (born 7 April 1989 in York) is a British triathlete. In 2009, he became the youngest triathlete to win an Ironman competition, at age 20, when he won the Ironman UK race.

Results

References

External links
 Philip Graves profile on Team Activist website

British male triathletes
1989 births
Living people
European Games competitors for Great Britain
Triathletes at the 2015 European Games